The European Exchange Rate Mechanism (ERM II) is a system introduced by the European Economic Community on 1 January 1999 alongside the introduction of a single currency, the euro (replacing ERM 1 and the euro's predecessor, the ECU) as part of the European Monetary System (EMS), to reduce exchange rate variability and achieve monetary stability in Europe.

After the adoption of the euro, policy changed to linking currencies of EU countries outside the eurozone to the euro (having the common currency as a central point). The goal was to improve the stability of those currencies, as well as to gain an evaluation mechanism for potential eurozone members. As of January 2023, two currencies participate in ERM II: the Danish krone and the Bulgarian lev.

Intent and operation of the ERM II
The ERM is based on the concept of fixed currency exchange rate margins, but with exchange rates variable within those margins. This is also known as a semi-pegged system. Before the introduction of the euro, exchange rates were based on the European Currency Unit (ECU), the European unit of account, whose value was determined as a weighted average of the participating currencies.

A grid (known as the Parity Grid) of bilateral rates was calculated on the basis of these central rates expressed in ECUs, and currency fluctuations had to be contained within a margin of 2.25% on either side of the bilateral rates (with the exception of the Italian lira, the Spanish peseta, the Portuguese escudo and sterling, which were allowed to fluctuate by ±6%). Determined intervention and loan arrangements protected the participating currencies from greater exchange rate fluctuations.

United Kingdom Chancellor of the Exchequer Denis Healey reportedly chose not to join the ERM in 1979 owing to concerns that it would benefit the German economy by preventing the Deutsche Mark from appreciating, at the expense of the economies of other countries. The UK did join the ERM in October 1990 under Chancellor John Major, in a move which at the time was largely supported by business and the press, but was forced to leave again two years later on Black Wednesday.

Historical exchange-rate regimes for EU members

The chart below provides a full summary of all applying exchange-rate regimes for EU members, since the European Monetary System with its Exchange Rate Mechanism and the related new common currency ECU came into being on 13 March 1979. The euro replaced the ECU 1:1 at the exchange rate markets, on 1 January 1999. Between 1979 and 1999 the D-Mark functioned as a de facto anchor for the ECU, meaning there was only a minor difference between pegging a currency against the ECU and pegging it against the D-Mark. 

The eurozone was established with its first 11 member states on 1 January 1999. The first enlargement of the eurozone, to Greece, took place on 1 January 2001, one year before the euro had physically entered into circulation. The zone's next enlargements were with states that joined the EU in 2004, and then joined the eurozone on 1 January in the mentioned year: Slovenia (2007), Cyprus (2008), Malta (2008), Slovakia (2009), Estonia (2011), Latvia (2014), and Lithuania (2015).

All new EU members having joined the bloc after the signing of the Maastricht Treaty in 1992 are obliged to adopt the euro under the terms of their accession treaties. However, the last of the five economic convergence criteria, which need to be complied with in order to qualify for euro adoption, is the exchange rate stability criterion. This requires having been a member of the ERM for a minimum of two years without the presence of "severe tensions" for the currency exchange rate.

Irish pound breaks parity with sterling
To participate in the European Monetary System, Ireland chose to break the Irish pound's parity with sterling in 1979, because the UK had decided not to participate. (The Irish Central Bank had maintained parity with sterling since the foundation of the state in 1922. "It was only in the 1970s, when high inflation in the UK threatened price stability in Ireland, that alternatives were seriously considered".)

Sterling's forced withdrawal from the ERM

The United Kingdom entered the ERM in October 1990, but was forced to exit the programme within two years after sterling came under major pressure from currency speculators. The ensuing crash of 16 September 1992 was subsequently dubbed "Black Wednesday". There was some revision of attitude towards this event given the UK's strong economic performance after 1992, with some commentators dubbing it "White Wednesday".

Some commentators, following Norman Tebbit, took to referring to ERM as an "Eternal Recession Mechanism", after the UK fell into recession in 1990. The UK spent over £6 billion trying to keep the currency within the narrow limits with reports at the time widely noting that the controversial Hungarian-American investor George Soros's individual profit of £1 billion equated to over £12 for each man, woman and child in Britain and dubbing Soros "the man who broke the Bank of England".

Britain's membership of the ERM was also blamed for prolonging the recession at the time, and Britain's exit from the ERM was seen as an economic failure which contributed significantly to the defeat of the Conservative government of John Major at the general election in May 1997, despite the strong economic recovery and significant fall in unemployment which that government had overseen after Black Wednesday.

Increase of margins
In August 1993, the margin was expanded to 15% to accommodate speculation against the French franc and other currencies.

History of the ERM II 
On 31 December 1998, the European Currency Unit (ECU) exchange rates of the eurozone countries were frozen and the value of the euro, which then superseded the ECU at par, was thus established.

In 1999, ERM II replaced the original ERM. The Greek and Danish currencies were part of the new mechanism, but when Greece joined the euro in 2001, the Danish krone was left at that time as the only participant member.  A currency in ERM II is allowed to float within a range of ±15% with respect to a central rate against the euro. In the case of the krone, Danmarks Nationalbank keeps the exchange rate within the narrower range of ± 2.25% against the central rate of EUR 1 = DKK 7.46038.

EU countries that have not adopted the euro are expected to participate for at least two years in ERM II before joining the eurozone.

New EU members 
On 1 May 2004, the ten national central banks (NCBs) of the new member countries became party to the ERM II Central Bank Agreement. The national currencies themselves were to become part of the ERM II at dates to be agreed.

The Estonian kroon, Lithuanian litas, and Slovenian tolar were included in the ERM II on 28 June 2004; the Cypriot pound, the Latvian lats and the Maltese lira on 2 May 2005; the Slovak koruna on 28 November 2005.

On 10 July 2020 it was announced that the Bulgarian lev (which had joined the EU on 1 January 2007) and Croatian kuna (which had joined the EU on 1 July 2013) would be included in the ERM II.

These states (with the exception of Bulgaria) have all since joined the eurozone, and hence left ERM II: Slovenia (1 January 2007), Cyprus (1 January 2008), Malta (1 January 2008), Slovakia (1 January 2009), Estonia (1 January 2011), Latvia (1 January 2014), Lithuania (1 January 2015), and Croatia (1 January 2023).

Current status 
As of January 2023, two currencies participate in ERM II: the Danish krone and the Bulgarian lev. The currencies of Sweden (the Swedish krona), the three largest countries which joined the European Union on 1 May 2004 (the Polish złoty, the Czech koruna, and the Hungarian forint), and Romania which joined on 1 January 2007 (the Romanian leu), are required to join in accordance with the terms of the applicable treaties of accession.

Sweden has voted in a referendum to stay out of the mechanism, despite being expected to join by the ECB, since Sweden has no opt-out like Denmark. EU members are required to join the ERM by the Maastricht convergence criteria.

Exchange rate bands 
In theory, most of the currencies are allowed to fluctuate as much as 15% from their assigned value. In practice, however, the currency of Denmark deviates very little.

Historical reference 
The former members of ERM II are the Greek drachma, Slovenian tolar, Cypriot pound, Estonian kroon, Maltese lira, Slovak koruna, Lithuanian litas, Latvian lats, and Croatian Kuna.

See also 
 Euro convergence criteria
 List of acronyms associated with the eurozone crisis

Citations

External links 
 The ERM on the UK Parliament website
 European Central Bank press releases
 Guardian Unlimited | Special reports | Pound drops out of ERM – 17 September 1992

Eurozone